Spring offensive may refer to:

Military
German spring offensive, Ludendorff's 1918 offensive of World War I
Spring offensive of the White Army, a 1919 offensive during the Russian Civil War
Italian spring offensive, part of the Greco-Italian War in 1941
Spring 1945 offensive in Italy, an Allied offensive in World War II
Chinese spring offensive, a Chinese offensive in 1951 during the Korean War
Easter Offensive, a spring 1972 North Vietnamese offensive during the Vietnam War
1975 spring offensive, a North Vietnamese offensive during the Vietnam War

Other uses
Spring Offensive (poem), a poem by Wilfred Owen about World War I
Spring Offensive Volume 1: Nuclear Winter Remixes, a 2010 album by Sole
Spring Offensive, a British indie rock band